Johnston-Truax House is a historic home located at Weirton, Hancock County, West Virginia. The original log section was built in 1785, and expanded about 1850 and in 1886.  It is a -story building with a one-story wing.  It has log walls covered with clapboard and in turn with siding.  It features a full porch with a shed roof.

It was listed on the National Register of Historic Places in 1993.

References

Houses on the National Register of Historic Places in West Virginia
Houses completed in 1785
Houses in Hancock County, West Virginia
National Register of Historic Places in Hancock County, West Virginia
Log buildings and structures on the National Register of Historic Places in West Virginia